"I Must Stand" is a song by American recording artist Ice-T. It was released on April 9, 1996 as a single from the rapper's sixth studio album Ice-T VI: Return of the Real through  Records/Priority Records/Virgin Records. The song was written and produced by Ice-T and Santiago "San Man" Sanguillen. The single peaked at number 83 on the Hot R&B/Hip-Hop Songs and number 23 on the Hot Rap Songs charts in the United States, and also reached number 23 and number 43 in the UK and Switzerland respectively. "I Must Stand" was later included in the rapper's greatest hits album Greatest Hits: The Evidence.

Track listing 

Sample credits
 Track "I Must Stand (The Dumb Mix)" contains elements from "Numb" by Portishead.

Personnel 
 Tracy Lauren Marrow – lyrics, vocals, backing vocals, producer
 Angela Rollins – backing vocals
 Nichele – backing vocals on "I Must Stand (Full Length) (Life On The Streets)"
 Eric Garcia – scratches
 Bobby Ross Avila – keyboards on "I Must Stand (Full Length) (Life On The Streets)"
 Santiago Sanguillen – producer
 Richard "DJ Ace" Ascencio – re-mixing (track: "I Must Stand (Full Length) (Life On The Streets)")
 Secret Squirel – re-mixing (track: "I Must Stand (The Dumb Mix)")
 Steve "Fred 40 To Tha Head" Fredrickson – re-mixing (track: "I Must Stand (Straight Ghetto Vibe)")
 Trevor Randolph – re-mixing (track: "I Must Stand (Straight Ghetto Vibe)")

Charts

References

External links 
 

1996 songs
1996 singles
Ice-T songs
Gangsta rap songs
Songs written by Ice-T